Massachusetts House of Representatives' 1st Norfolk district in the United States is one of 160 legislative districts included in the lower house of the Massachusetts General Court. It covers part of Norfolk County. Democrat Bruce Ayers of Quincy has represented the district since 1999.

Locales represented
The district includes the following localities:
 part of Quincy
 Randolph

The current district geographic boundary overlaps with those of the Massachusetts Senate's Norfolk and Plymouth district and Norfolk, Bristol and Plymouth district.

Former locales
The district previously covered:
 Dedham, circa 1872, 1927 
 Needham, circa 1927 
 Wellesley, circa 1927

Representatives
 Ezra W. Taft, circa 1858-1859 
 Frank A. Fales, circa 1888 
George S. Winslow, 1892
 Joseph Soliday, circa 1908
 John Hirsch, circa 1918
 Samuel H. Wragg, circa 1920 
 James McCracken, circa 1935
 Mason Sears, circa 1935
 Alfred Keith, circa 1945
 Avery Gilkerson, circa 1945
 John Taylor, circa 1945
 Clifton H. Baker, circa 1951 
 Carter Lee, circa 1951 
 Amelio Della Chiesa, circa 1953
 Joseph Brett, circa 1967
 Walter Hannon, circa 1967
 Thomas F. Brownell
 Robert A. Cerasoli, 1975-1979 
 Michael W. Morrissey, 1979–1993
 Michael G. Bellotti, 1993–1999
 Bruce J. Ayers, 1999-current

See also
 List of Massachusetts House of Representatives elections
 Other Norfolk County districts of the Massachusetts House of Representatives: 2nd, 3rd, 4th, 5th, 6th, 7th, 8th, 9th, 10th, 11th, 12th, 13th, 14th, 15th
 List of Massachusetts General Courts
 List of former districts of the Massachusetts House of Representatives

Images

References

External links

 Ballotpedia
  (State House district information based on U.S. Census Bureau's American Community Survey).

House
Government of Norfolk County, Massachusetts